Hans Hömberg (14 December 1903 – 4 July 1982) was a German playwright, journalist, novelist and screenwriter. Hömberg worked occasionally on feature film scripts, and supplied the idea for Alexis Granowsky's 1931 comedy film The Trunks of Mr. O.F. (1931).  Hömberg enjoyed a successful stage career, his biggest hit being Cherries for Rome (1940) although he faced censorship issues with some of his works.

During the Nazi era he also wrote film reviews. He wrote the novelisation of the controversial anti-Semitic 1940 film Jud Süß directed by Veit Harlan.

Selected filmography
 The Trunks of Mr. O.F. (1931)
 A Woman With Power of Attorney (1934)
 Don't Lose Heart, Suzanne! (1935)
 Much Ado About Nixi (1942)
 His Royal Highness (1953)

Plays
 Cherries for Rome (1940)
 Napoleon in Corsica (1945)

References

Bibliography
 Tegel, Susan. Jew Suss: His Life and Afterlife in Legend, Literature and Film. Continuum, 2011. 
 Youngkin, Stephen. The Lost One: A Life of Peter Lorre. University Press of Kentucky, 2005.

External links

1903 births
1982 deaths
Writers from Berlin
German male journalists
German male screenwriters
20th-century German novelists
German male novelists
20th-century German male writers
20th-century German screenwriters
20th-century German journalists